Willard Saulsbury Jr. (April 17, 1861 – February 20, 1927) was an American lawyer and politician from Wilmington, in New Castle County, Delaware. He was a member of the Democratic Party who served as U.S. Senator from Delaware and President Pro Tempore of the U.S. Senate.

Early life and family
Saulsbury was born in Georgetown, Delaware, son of Willard Saulsbury, Sr., and nephew of Gove Saulsbury and Eli M. Saulsbury. He married May Lammot du Pont, the granddaughter of Charles I. du Pont. He attended private schools and the University of Virginia at Charlottesville, where he was a member of St. Anthony Hall. Subsequently, he studied law, was admitted to the bar in 1882, and commenced practice in Wilmington, Delaware.

He was president of the New Castle Bar Association and chairman of the board of censors.

Political career
Saulsbury was a member of the Democratic National Committee from 1908 until 1920.  He ran for U.S. Senator in 1899, 1901, 1903, 1905, 1907, and 1911, but Republicans controlled the state legislature and he was unsuccessful.

Democrats were in control of the legislature in 1913, the last time U.S. Senators were chosen by state legislators.  Saulsbury was the preference of most Democrats and obtained the required majority after several days of balloting.  During this term, he served with the Democratic majority in the 63rd, 64th, and 65th Congresses from March 4, 1913, until March 3, 1919. He was the President Pro Tempore of the Senate during the 64th and 65th Congresses. In the 63rd, 64th, and 65th Congresses he was Chairman of the Committee on Coast and Insular Survey, and in the 65th Congress he was also a member of the Committee on Pacific Islands and Puerto Rico.

By the time his term expired, the Seventeenth Amendment to the United States Constitution had been enshrined, so he had to face voters for the first time. In the election of 1918, he lost to Republican L. Heisler Ball, a former U.S. Senator. This loss has been attributed to his opposition to women's suffrage in the United States and his refusal to support the Nineteenth Amendment to the United States Constitution.

Later years

After leaving the Senate, he was a member of the advisory committee of the Conference on Limitation of Armaments in Washington, D.C., in 1921 and 1922, and a member of the Pan American Conference in Santiago, Chile, in 1923.

He continued the practice of law in Wilmington and Washington, D.C., until his death.

Saulsbury died in Wilmington and is buried in the Christ Episcopal Church Cemetery at Dover.

References

External links

Biographical Directory of the United States
Delaware’s Members of Congress

The Political Graveyard 
University of Delaware's Willard Saulsbury, Jr., political papers

|-

|-

|-

|-

|-

1861 births
1927 deaths
20th-century American politicians
American Episcopalians
Burials in Dover, Delaware
Delaware Democrats
Delaware lawyers
Democratic Party United States senators from Delaware
People from Georgetown, Delaware
People from Wilmington, Delaware
Presidents pro tempore of the United States Senate
Candidates in the 1924 United States presidential election
Saulsbury family
University of Virginia alumni
19th-century American lawyers
Du Pont family